Trayvon Sentell Mullen Jr. (born September 20, 1997) is an American football cornerback for the Baltimore Ravens of the National Football League (NFL). Mullen was a highly recruited cornerback coming out of high school and was rated by ESPN as the number two cornerback in his class. He played college football at Clemson.

College career
Mullen was rated highly by ESPN in his class. Multiple schools offered Mullen a scholarship offer, including LSU, Florida State and Alabama. Mullen chose to attend Clemson on national signing day. 
In his freshman season at Clemson, Mullen played sporadically. He recorded 15 tackles and 1 pass-breakup. In Mullen's sophomore season he received significantly more playing time, as he recorded 42 tackles, three interceptions and seven pass breakups in 668 snaps over 13 games, starting 12. After the season Mullen was selected as a Honorable Mention All-ACC selection.  Following the 2018 season, Mullen announced that he would forgo his senior year and declared for the 2019 NFL Draft.

College statistics

Professional career

Oakland / Las Vegas Raiders
Mullen was drafted by the Oakland Raiders in the second round (40th overall) of the 2019 NFL Draft.

2019
Mullen made his NFL debut in week 1 against the Denver Broncos.  In the game, Mullen made 1 tackle in the 24–16 win.
In week 11 against the Cincinnati Bengals, Mullen recorded his first interception off Ryan Finley in the 17–10 win.
In week 16 against the Los Angeles Chargers, Mullen suffered a head injury, which caused him to be carted off the field.

2020
In Week 11 against the Kansas City Chiefs on Sunday Night Football, Mullen recorded his first interception of the season off a pass thrown by Patrick Mahomes during the 35–31 loss.

2021
Mullen entered the 2021 season as a starting cornerback alongside Casey Hayward. He suffered a foot injury in Week 4 and was placed on injured reserve on October 9, 2021. On December 11, Mullen rejoined the active roster. He suffered a toe injury in Week 14 and was placed on injured reserve on December 20.

Arizona Cardinals
On August 30, 2022, the Raiders traded Mullen to the Arizona Cardinals in exchange of a seventh round pick (the pick could have ended up being a sixth-rounder if Mullen was active for 10 or more games in 2022.) He was released on December 13, 2022.

Dallas Cowboys
Mullen was claimed off waivers by the Dallas Cowboys on December 14, 2022. He was released on January 21, 2023.

Baltimore Ravens
On January 23, 2023, the Baltimore Ravens claimed Mullen off waivers.

Personal life
His younger brother, Tiawan, also plays cornerback for Indiana University. Mullen is the cousin of Baltimore Ravens quarterback Lamar Jackson.

References

External links
 
 Clemson Tigers bio

1997 births
Living people
People from Coconut Creek, Florida
Players of American football from Florida
Sportspeople from Broward County, Florida
American football cornerbacks
Clemson Tigers football players
Las Vegas Raiders players
Oakland Raiders players
Arizona Cardinals players
Dallas Cowboys players
Baltimore Ravens players